John Davani is a Papua New Guinean professional football manager.

Career
In 2002, he was a head coach of the Papua New Guinea national football team. Since 2010 until 2011 he coached the PNG Under-17 team.

References

External links
Profile at Soccerway.com

Year of birth missing (living people)
Living people
Papua New Guinean football managers
Papua New Guinea national football team managers
Place of birth missing (living people)